Song Hwa-son (born 26 February 1968) is a North Korean speed skater. She competed at the 1988 Winter Olympics and the 1992 Winter Olympics.

References

External links
 

1968 births
Living people
North Korean female speed skaters
Olympic speed skaters of North Korea
Speed skaters at the 1988 Winter Olympics
Speed skaters at the 1992 Winter Olympics
Place of birth missing (living people)
Speed skaters at the 1986 Asian Winter Games
Universiade bronze medalists for North Korea
Universiade medalists in speed skating
Competitors at the 1991 Winter Universiade